This is a list of the first-level administrative divisions of the People's Republic of China (PRC), including all provinces, autonomous regions, municipalities, and special administrative regions in order of their Human Development Index (HDI), along with the Republic of China (ROC, Taiwan). The subnational and national average figures for PRC/ROC division are mainly derived from the Subnational Human Development Index (SHDI), published by the Global Data Lab at Radboud University. The index did not cover Macau, a special administrative region of the PRC. Only divisions of Mainland China are given ranking numbers in the list as the national HDI for China which calculated by the annual UNDP Human Development Report is exclusively applied to mainland only.

List of administrative divisions by HDI

The Subnational Human Development Database (2021 data) 

Notes:

Trend

See also 

 List of countries by Human Development Index

References

External links 

United Nations Development Programme (UNDP) in China
Publications

Human development index
HDI
China
Economy of China by province
Human Development Index